The World Triathlon Aquathlon Championships is a aquathlon championship competition organised by World Triathlon. The competition has been held annually since 1998. The championships is a continually timed race containing a swim stage and either one or two run stages. Typically, the race consists of run—swim—run segments. When the water is less 22 degrees Celsius, a wetsuit is required and the race starts with the swim stage, followed by a single run stage, so that participants do not have to put on a wetsuit mid race. The total run distance is around 5 km and the swim is between 750m and 1 km. However the distances have varied during the event's history depending on local circumstances.

Champions

Men's championship

Source:

Women's championship

Source:

Venues

References

Aquathlon World Championships
Aquathlon
Aquathlon